Giorgio Nurigiani (1892–1981) was an Italian writer, publicist, linguist and historian from Rome. He is of Armenian origin.

Italian – Macedonian relations
He was born in Livorno. His grandfather's brother was the Patriarch of Armenian Catholics of Constantinopole. Before World War II, Nurigiani resided in Sofia (Bulgaria), where he learned about the Internal Macedonian Revolutionary Organization and he started to support their ideals. He wrote a couple of books and studies on Macedonian matters. In 1967 he collaborated with the Macedonian linguist Naum Kitanovski and they published an Italian – Macedonian dictionary.

Works
 Grammatica bulgara ad uso degli italiani. Con pref. di S. Mladenov, Sofia 1920 
 Dieci anni di vita bulgara (1920 – 1930), Sofia 1931, 224 p.
 Il paese delle rose Bulgaria, Sofia 1936, 34 p.
 Glorie bulgare, Sofia 1942, 207 с.
 Macedonia Yesterday and Today (1967)
 The Autocephalous Macedonian Orthodox Church and Its Head Dositej (1968)
 The Macedonian Genius Through the Centuries (1972)

Notes

1892 births
1981 deaths
Macedonian Question
Italian male writers
Italian journalists
Italian literary critics